Knights of Babylon is a New Orleans Mardi Gras krewe that was founded in 1939.

Parade 
The Knights of Babylon parade on Jeudi Gras, the Thursday night prior to Mardi Gras. The Knights of Babylon Parade rolls annually on its traditional Uptown New Orleans parade route. Babylon is always the first parade on this evening, leading the way for the other Thursday parades, and blazing the trail for Carnival weekend festivities.

Its route starts at the intersection of Magazine Street and Napoleon Avenue, turning right toward downtown at St. Charles Avenue. It travels downtown on St. Charles Avenue past Lee Circle and onward to Canal Street where the parade disbands in front of the Marriott Hotel. Following the parade, Babylon's invitation-only tableau ball and supper dance are held at the Marriott Hotel. Originally, the traditional tableau and ball had been staged at the Municipal Auditorium until 2005, when this facility sustained extensive hurricane damage, prompting the organization to move the ball to an alternate venue.

The Knights of Babylon are one of the few krewes left that utilize the traditional hand-held flambeaux to light the parade route on foot.

Parade History 
Babylon has always received the highest praise for adhering faithfully to the most cherished Carnival traditions. Their floats have the same basic designs and dimensions that they did at the krewe's inception more than 75 years ago, and the King's Float is mule drawn. Additionally, in keeping with the tenets of a mystic krewe, the organization requires all riders to remain masked throughout the entire duration of our parade. Unlike many Carnival organizations that rent floats, the Knights of Babylon own all of their floats and the den that houses them.

Originally, Babylon's parade and attendant parade-day festivities were held on the Wednesday before Mardi Gras. The Krewe of Momus, which historically paraded on Thursday evening, stopped parading in 1992, and, as a result, in 1993, Babylon moved its parade and tableau ball to the Thursday immediately before Mardi Gras. Babylon is the first of the three uptown parades on this night, leading the way into the festivities of the weekend before Mardi Gras. The Knights of Babylon are proud to uphold the traditions of Carnival on this festive evening. As many locals say, “CARNIVAL BEGINS WHEN BABYLON ROLLS!"

Parade themes

Royal court 
The Knights of Babylon annually present a royal court including a King Sargon of Akkad, Sargon's Queen, Sargon's royal pages, the queen's royal pages, ladies in waiting, princesses, and royal maids. The identity of King Sargon is kept secret and is never revealed.

Iconic floats 
Sargon is the first float of the parade and carries Sargon the Magnificent, the annually selected king of the krewe, and four royal pages. The float is pulled by mule and is made entirely of papier-mâché.
The Carrollton Streetcar carries the officers of the Knights of Babylon. The float pays homage to the oldest continuously running streetcar line in the United States. The float is pulled by mule.
Hanging Gardens of Babylon are one of the Seven Wonders of the Ancient World. Built to please the king's wife, the fabled Hanging Gardens garnered global fame and adorned the palace of Nebuchadnezzar.
Gates of Ishtar are the main gates that open to the ancient city of Babylon.
The Babylonian Barge is modeled after the barges used on the Nile River by the Babylonians and debuted in 2014.
The Jester's Float traditionally carries young knights of the krewe. The Jesters Float was named in honor of the Jesters Club, the parent club of the Knights of Babylon.

Throws 
Trinkets, collectables, masks, and beads tossed by hand from riders of the floats are called throws. Collectible throws from the Knights of Babylon include the light up necklaces, light up jester beads, light up streetcar necklace, and jester hats.

References 

Mardi Gras in New Orleans